The Presidential Commission is the collective vice-presidency of Ireland.

Membership
Three members serve on the Presidential Commission.

The President of the High Court acts as a member in place of the Chief Justice if that office is vacant. The Leas-Cheann Comhairle acts as a member in place of the Ceann Comhairle if that office is vacant. The Leas-Chathaoirleach acts as a member in place of the Cathaoirleach if that office is vacant. The Commission may act with at least two members.

A proposal to abolish the Seanad, which was rejected at referendum in 2013, would have seen the Leas-Cheann Comhairle take the place of the Cathaoirleach on the Commission.

Powers
The Presidential Commission fulfills all functions and duties of the office of President of Ireland when the office of President is vacant, or when the President is unavailable.

Vacancy may occur:
 on the death of the incumbent, as in 1974;
 on the resignation of the incumbent, as in 1976 and 1997;
 by impeachment of the incumbent, which has never happened.
 in the short interval between the conclusion of one president's term of office and the inauguration of a successor the next day — although the Presidential Commission has never been required to act in this time;

The Presidential Commission has often acted when the President is abroad, typically while making a state visit. When the government of the 26th Dáil collapsed in November 1992, president Mary Robinson was abroad. The resignation of the Progressive Democrats ministers, the appointment by Taoiseach Albert Reynolds of caretaker Fianna Fáil replacement ministers, and Reynolds' request for a dissolution of the Dáil, were all effected by the Presidential Commission. Temporary illness may also indispose the President. No President has ever refused to fulfil any of the duties of office.

Bills have occasionally been signed into law while the President is out of the country, including the Marriage Act 2015 legalising same-sex marriage due to Michael D. Higgins being in the United States.

Origins

The Presidential Commission was created in the 1937 Constitution of Ireland. It was first used between December 1937, when the Constitution came into force, and June 1938, when the first President was inaugurated. Initially, as the Irish senate had not been constituted and elected, the seat on the Presidential Commission intended for the Cathaoirleach of Seanad Éireann was filled by the President of the High Court under the Transitory Provisions of the Constitution.

Members of the Presidential Commission as acting President of Ireland

1937–38
From the adoption of the Constitution of Ireland to the inauguration of Douglas Hyde.

1974
From the death of Erskine H. Childers to the inauguration of Cearbhall Ó Dálaigh.

1976
From the resignation of Cearbhall Ó Dálaigh to the inauguration of Patrick Hillery.

1997
From the resignation of Mary Robinson to the inauguration of Mary McAleese.

See also
Council of State
Seal of the President of Ireland
Lords Commissioners deputise at Westminster for the UK monarch
Lord Justices (Ireland) deputised in Dublin when the Lord Lieutenant of Ireland was in Britain

References

External links

Politics of the Republic of Ireland
Commission
Ireland